Christian Theodore Pedersen (23 December 1876 – 20 June 1969) was a Norwegian-American seaman, whaling captain and fur trader active in Alaska, Canada, and the northern Pacific from the 1890s to the 1930s. He was called "one of the canniest old skippers in the western arctic" by a contemporary.

Biography
Pedersen, known as Theodore to his friends  and usually as C.T. Pedersen for business, was born 23 December 1876 in Sandefjord, Norway.  He left on his first whaling voyage at age 17; by 1908 he was captain of the schooner Challenge which wintered in the arctic at Herschel island. He was captain of the schooner Elvira in 1912.  Pedersen was associated with the early stages of the Canadian Arctic Expedition under Vilhjalmur Stefansson whom he had known since 1906. He helped select the steam brigantine Karluk for the expedition and sailed it from San Francisco to Victoria, British Columbia.  He resigned before the ship was outfitted and was replaced by Robert Bartlett.

Pedersen then returned to the Elvira for whaling and trading in the arctic in 1913. In August 1913, the Elvira was frozen in and damaged by ice near Icy Reef west of Demarcation Point on Alaska's arctic coast (east of Kaktovik, Alaska and west of the Canada–US border). The ship was further damaged by a storm to the point that Pedersen and her crew were forced to abandon her and seek refuge aboard the Belvedere. Pedersen and Olaf Swenson of the Belvedere traveled overland by foot and dogsled to Fairbanks to carry news and arrange relief supplies for the crews on the Belvedere.  Sources differ on whether Pederson was owner as well as captain of the Elvira.

Pedersen then signed on as captain of the whaling and trading ship Herman for the H. Liebes Company of San Francisco.  The 1914 voyage of the Herman was the subject of a motion picture by Dr. L. Lawrence, a videotape copy of which is held by the University of Alaska.  In the course of this voyage, the Herman picked up Captain Robert Bartlett at Emma Harbor, Siberia and transported him to St. Michael, Alaska where Bartlett transmitted to Ottawa the news that the Karluk had been crushed in the ice and the survivors were marooned on Wrangel Island off the northern coast of Siberia.

Pedersen married May Olive Jordan (5/11/1893-4/22/1982), a Canadian nurse, in 1920. Subsequently, she accompanied him on many arctic trips and provided medicines and health services to the natives at their stops. They had one son, Charles.  Pedersen had several children from previous relationships including sons Ted and Walter who were well-known Alaskans.

Pedersen resigned from H. Liebes Company in 1923 and went into business on his own account with the schooner Ottillie Fjord, which was refitted with an engine and operated as the motor schooner Nanuk in 1924 and 1925.  The business was incorporated as the Northern Whaling and Trading Company.  A Canadian subsidiary, the Canalaska Trading Company, operated two small trading schooners with the goods transferred at Herschel Island. The company established trading posts throughout the Kitikmeot region of Canada.  After 1925 the Nanuk was replaced by the larger Patterson, formerly a USCGS survey ship. The Nanuk was sold to the Swenson Fur Trading Company in 1927. Besides establishing fixed trading posts, Pederson developed a strategy of offering small schooners for trappers.  These were built to order in California and carried to the arctic on the Patterson.  The last of these schooners, North Star of Herschel Island, delivered in 1936, is now in private hands in Victoria, British Columbia.  Canalaska was sold to the Hudson's Bay Company in 1936; Pedersen retired from the sea but continued to be involved in the fur trade as a business owner.  Pedersen's trading voyage in 1935 was filmed by his son Ted and videotapes derived from that film are in the collection of the University of Alaska.  That archive also has a substantial collection of Pedersen's business records.

Pedersen was killed by intruders in his Pacifica, San Mateo County, California home on 20 June 1969. His wife was also beaten; she survived but sustained severe injuries and did not live independently again.  Two escaped convicts found hiding on the premises were arrested in the crime.

Notes

References
 Alaska State Library Ted Pedersen Photograph Collection, 1910-1988  Historical Collections PCA 377. Collection description (.doc format) includes biographical information on both C.T. Pedersen and his son Ted Pedersen (1905–1990). Some photos from the collection at Alaska Digital Archives
 Browness, E. Rendle "History of the Early Mink People in Canada" "Quebec" accessed 5/28/2010.
 
 Breynat, Gabriel (1955) translated by Alan Gordon Smith. Bishop Of The Winds Fifty Years In The Arctic Regions. P. J. Kenedy & Sons, NY, pp 183–184.
 California Death Records at Rootsweb Search Pederson with death place San Mateo (California records are by county); this gives first name as Christia, sex M, death date 6/20/1969; click the SSN to confirm with Social Security index which lists as PEDERSEN, CHRISTIAN .
 Consortium Library, Archives and Special Collections Department, University of Alaska, Anchorage / Alaska Pacific University;
 (a) "Christian T. Pedersen collection description" Accessed April 27, 2009;
 (b) "Theodore Pedersen collection description" accessed April 26, 2009
 Diubaldo, Richard J. Stefansson and the Canadian Arctic McGill-Queen's Press - MQUP, 1998  pp70, 79, 104
 Downes, P. "Prentice Downs eastern arctic journal 1936, edited and introduced by R.H. Cockburn."  Arctic 36 (3) 232-250 1983.  Downes is quoting an old arctic hand he terms the "Mad Major". accessed April 27, 2009.
 Jenness, Stuart Edward.  The Making of an Explorer: George Hubert Wilkins and the Canadian Arctic Expedition, 1913-1916. McGill-Queen's Press - MQUP, 2004, pp6, 66, 142. accessed April 26, 2009.
 Kitikmeot Heritage Society. C. T. Pedersen and Canalaska  accessed April 26, 2009.
 Los Angeles Times June 22, 1969, page AA. "Man who once saved Adm. Peary aide slain".
Macdonald, Sheila and Bruce Macdonald  A Brief History of North Star of Herschel Island accessed April 27, 2009
 Minerals Management Service, U.S. Department of Interior.  "Shipwrecks off Alaska's coast"  accessed April 26, 2009 query Elvira. Updated ref  - download the pdf  here or from the link on the top line of the page. 
 Query Pedersen.
 Social Security Death Index (Social Security Administration) at Rootsweb
 Stefansson, Vilhjalmur The Friendly Arctic, McMillan, NY, 1922 P 270
 Swenson, Olaf.  Northwest of the World.  Dodd Mead, NY, 1944, pp 103–119.
 Tacoma Public Library, "Ships and Shipping Database"; accessed April 28, 2009.
 (a.) query Elvira. This source quotes Gordon Newell, "Maritime Events of 1913," H.W. McCurdy Marine History of the Pacific Northwest, p. 230.
 (b.) query Nanuk. This source quotes Gordon Newell, "Maritime Events of 1933," H.W. McCurdy Marine History of the Pacific Northwest, p. 423.

Further reading
 MacDonald, R. Bruce. North Star of Herschel Island - The Last Canadian Arctic Fur Trading Ship. Friesen Press, 2012 . Chapter 2 is a short biography of Pedersen.
 THE LIFE AND TIMES OF A MARINER. Theodore Pedersen's photo archives. Frame of Reference (Newsletter of the Alaska Humanities Forum) v9 (1), April 1998. pp 1,  10-13. Photographs of C.T. and Ted Pedersen, and the ships Elvira and Herman, along with scenes from whaling and trading activities.

External links
 Captain Christian Theodore Pedersen and the Arctic Fur Trade; Sven Johansson, with contributions from John MacFarlane, 1990; Nauticapedia.ca   (Biographical sketch of Pedersen with information not available elsewhere, cites unpublished Pedersen papers in Johansson's collection.  Captain Johansson was the restorer of North Star of Herschel Island, which he purchased in 1967, and Captained John Bockstoce's Belvedere in its traverse of the Northwest Passage.) see also Pedersen, Christian Theodore. Accessed August 6, 2011, December 5, 2011. 
 C.T. Pedersen photo collection at the Glenbow Museum
 Yukon Department of Tourism and Culture L'île Herschel: Qikiqtaruk - Guide du patrimoine historique Article in French; fourth photograph is the Patterson at Pauline Cove, Herschel Island, also has a photograph of the Northern Whaling & Trading Co. warehouse.
 "A race for a fortune" Popular Mechanics July 1927 pp 69–73. Includes a sketch of the Nanuk and a discussion of the unofficial but hotly contested race between the fur trading ships to the Arctic and back. Pedersen a source and the principal subject.
 Whaling in Alaska and the Yukon Bering Sea and Arctic Ocean, mostly late 19th early 20th centuries; context, references about the period. At ExploreNorth.

History of the Arctic
American fur traders
Sea captains
People of the Alaska Territory
Norwegian people in whaling
1876 births
1969 deaths
Norwegian emigrants to the United States
People from Sandefjord
People from Pacifica, California
People from Alameda County, California
History of the Inuvialuit Settlement Region